Todd Alsup is an American pianist and singer-songwriter based in New York City. He has been profiled in Billboard Magazine and Performing Songwriter and featured on MTV, PBS, and Sirius XM Radio. He has toured throughout the United States and Europe.

Early life and education
Alsup was born and raised in Waterford, Michigan and began studying piano at the age of 11.  He graduated from Waterford Mott High School and moved to New York City where he attended the Steinhardt School at New York University, graduating with a Bachelor of Music in vocal performance.

Career
Alsup began performing his original songs in Manhattan clubs in 2007. His first EP release "Facts & Figures" was produced by Major Who Media and received favorable press including features in Billboard Magazine and Performing Songwriter.  In 2008, Alsup was selected to be a Yamaha Corporate Artist, joining an impressive list of legendary artists including Elton John, Paul McCartney, Alicia Keys and John Legend representing the Yamaha brand.  In 2009, Alsup began touring colleges and universities up and down the East Coast.

His follow-up LP, "Todd Alsup" (released in 2011) was produced by Steve Greenwell, Jeremy Sklarsky and James Walsh.  The album features the singles "How I'm Made," "The Only Thing," and "Let's Have A Party" (which was featured on MTV's "The Real World: New Orleans").

In November 2010, Alsup's song "How I'm Made" became a Top 12 Finalist, alongside artists Lucius in the 5th Annual Songwriters Circle Contest in New York City. Past winners include Kate Voegele, Company of Thieves, and Mieka Pauley. Placing in the Top 5, word of Alsup's talent reached legendary music industry blogger Bob Lefsetz. "If this record came out when I was in college everybody would know who Todd Alsup was", Lefsetz writes. "If you think this guy has no talent you know nothing".

A club remix of the single "The Only Thing," produced by legendary DJ Richard Cutmore was released in 2011 and "The Only Thing" won the 2012 OutMusic Award for "Pop Song of the Year."

In March 2012, Alsup was invited to perform at the 23rd Annual GLAAD Media Awards in New York City.  The following month he was invited by Yamaha to showcase alongside Vanessa Carlton, Jon McLaughlin, and Landon Pigg at Yamaha's annual entertainment conference, hosted by the comedian Sinbad (entertainer).

Alsup is currently in the studio completing his third studio album.  The project was funded in part by fans (known as the Todd Squad) via a successful Kickstarter campaign in April 2015.  The work on this project was done across continents with Swiss producer Orlando Ribar.  Much of the recording was done in Switzerland and additional recording was done at Threshold Studios in New York City.

Discography 
 2008: Facts & Figures (EP)
 2011: Todd Alsup (LP)
 2011: The Only Thing (Cutmore Mixes)
 2012: Todd Alsup Live at Sirius XM (EP)

References

External links
 

Year of birth missing (living people)
Living people
21st-century American male musicians
21st-century American pianists
American male pianists
American male singer-songwriters
American rock pianists
American rock singers
American rock songwriters
People from Waterford, Michigan
Singer-songwriters from Michigan
Singer-songwriters from New York (state)